Cees is a Dutch masculine given name, a short form of Cornelis. Since, as in English, the letter "c" before "e" is normally pronounced  in Dutch, the alternative spelling Kees is more common.

Notable people named Cees include:
 Cees Andriesse (born 1939), Dutch physicist and historian of science
 Cees Bal (born 1951), Dutch cyclist
 Cees Berkhouwer (1919–1992), Dutch VVD politician
 Cees van Bladel (born 1962), Dutch sports sailor
 Cees Bol (born 1995), Dutch cyclist
 Cees van Bruchem (born 1950), Dutch politician
 Cees Dekker (born 1959), Dutch biophysicist
 Cees Doorakkers (born 1963), Dutch motorcycle road racer
 Cees van Dongen (1932–2011), Dutch motorcycle road racer
 Cees van Espen (born 1938), Dutch road cyclist
 Cees Geel (born 1965), Dutch television, radio and film actor
 Cees Gravesteijn (born 1928), Dutch canoer
 Cees Groot (1932–1988), Dutch footballer
 Cees Haast (born 1938), Dutch cyclist
 Cees Hamelink (born 1940), Dutch communication scientist
 Cees Heerschop (1935–2014), Dutch footballer
 Cees Helder (born 1948), Dutch chef
 Cees Jan Diepeveen (born 1956), Dutch biophysicist
 Cees Juffermans (born 1982), Dutch short track speed skater
 Cees Keizer (born 1986), Dutch footballer
 Cees van der Knaap (born 1951), Dutch CDA politician
 Cees Koch (born 1925), Dutch canoer
 Cees Koch (born 1936), Dutch discus thrower and shot putter
 Cees van Kooten (1948–2015), Dutch footballer
 Cees Krijnen (born 1969), Dutch contemporary artist
 Cees Kurpershoek (born 1943), Dutch sports sailor
 Cees Lagrand (born 1936), Dutch canoer
 Cees van der Leeuw (1890–1973), Dutch artist
 Cees Lok (born 1966), Dutch footballer
 Cees Maas (born 1947), Dutch chief financial officer
 Cees Nooteboom (born 1933), Dutch novelist, poet, and journalist
 Cees Paauwe (born 1977), Dutch football goalkeeper
 Cees Priem (born 1950), Dutch cyclist
 Cees van Riel (born 1951), Dutch organizational theorist
 Cees Schapendonk (born 1955), Dutch footballer
 Cees See (1934–1985), Dutch jazz drummer
 Cees Stam (born 1945), Dutch track cyclist
 Cees Timmer (1903–1978), Dutch artist
 Cees Toet (born 1987), Dutch footballer
 Cees Veerman (1943–2014), Dutch singer, composer and guitarist
 Cees Veerman (born 1949), Dutch CDA politician
 Cees Vervoorn (born 1960), Dutch swimmer
 Cees de Vreugd (1952–1998), Dutch strongman and powerlifter
 Cees Jan Winkel (born 1962), Dutch swimmer
 Cees de Wolf (1945–2011), Dutch footballer

See also 
 
 
 Kees (given name)
 Kees (surname)
 CEES (disambiguation)

References 

Dutch masculine given names